Kerrie Brown is a set decorator. She was nominated for an Academy Award in the category Best Art Direction for the film Babe.

Selected filmography
 The Raven (2012)
 The Chronicles of Narnia: Prince Caspian (2008)
 The Chronicles of Narnia: The Lion, the Witch and the Wardrobe (2005)
 Peter Pan (2003)
 Babe (1995)

References

External links

Year of birth missing (living people)
Living people
Set decorators